Richard Dimitri (born June 27, 1942) is an American character actor and comedian principally known for his roles as the twin characters of Bertram and Renaldo in the 1975 Mel Brooks television show When Things Were Rotten and Roman Troy Moronie in the 1984 movie Johnny Dangerously.

He also had supporting roles in the 1977 movie The World's Greatest Lover with Gene Wilder and Carol Kane and the 1989 movie Let It Ride with Richard Dreyfuss, as well as numerous appearances on television shows like Hawaii Five-O (1968), the 1977 miniseries Seventh Avenue, and the late 1990s Tracey Ullman show Tracey Takes On.

Dimitri was credited as a writer on the show Going Bananas, a live-action superhero show created by the Hanna-Barbera studios, and also produced and wrote a pilot for a comedy show called Roosevelt and Truman, about a pair of bail bondsmen/security guards with the names Roosevelt and Truman.

References

External links
 

1942 births
Living people